Arab Canadians come from all of the countries of the Arab world. According to the 2016 Census, there were 523,235 Canadians, or 1.87%, who claimed Arab ancestry. According to the 2011 census there were 380,620 Canadians who claimed full or partial ancestry from an Arabic-speaking country. The large majority of the Canadians of Arab origin population live in either Ontario or Quebec. Not all Canadians from the Arab world are necessarily of Arab blood, there are also communities of Armenians, Assyrians/Syriacs, Copts, Kurds, Turcomans, Berbers, and those who espouse a Phoenician or Aramean heritage (see Phoenicianism and Arameanism).

Demographics
The distribution of the Arab population of Canada according to the 2001, 2011, and 2016 Canadian censuses was as follows:

By Arabic-speaking country

Notable individuals

Business
Feras Antoon - co-founder and CEO of MindGeek (of Syrian descent)
Kevin O'Leary - entrepreneur and reality television personality (Dragons' Den, Shark Tank) (of Lebanese and Irish descent)
Ablan Leon - founder of Leon's furniture company in 1901 in Welland, Ontario.

Politicians

 Doreen Assaad - current Egyptian-Canadian Woman Mayor in Brossard, Quebec
Omar Alghabra - current Liberal MP in the federal riding of Mississauga Centre in Ontario, Canada (of Syrian descent, born in Saudi Arabia)
Pierre de Bané - former Liberal MP (1968–1984), Cabinet Minister and former Senator (of Palestinian descent)
Michael Basha - former member of the Senate of Canada (of Lebanese descent)
Tarik Brahmi - former NDP member of House of Commons for Saint-Jean (of Algerian descent)
Fonse Faour - former NDP MP and leader of Newfoundland NDP (of Lebanese descent)
Eddie Francis - Mayor of Windsor, Ontario (of Lebanese descent)
Joe Ghiz - former Premier of Prince Edward Island (of Lebanese descent)
Robert Ghiz - Premier of Prince Edward Island (of Lebanese descent)
Sadia Groguhé - former NDP member of House of Commons for Saint-Lambert (of Algerian descent)
Mac Harb - Senator, former Liberal MP (1988–2004) and former Ottawa City Councilor (of Lebanese descent)
Sana Hassainia - former NDP member of House of Commons for Verchères—Les Patriotes riding (of Tunisian descent)
Lorraine Michael - former Nun, leader of New Democratic Party of Newfoundland and Labrador (of Lebanese descent)
Maria Mourani - former Bloc Québécois (2006–2013) and independent MP (2013–2015) in federal riding of Ahuntsic in Quebec, Canada (of Lebanese descent)
Khalil Ramal - Ontario MPP (of Lebanese descent)
Djaouida Sellah - former NDP member of House of Commons for Saint-Bruno—Saint-Hubert (of Algerian descent)
Paul Zed - lawyer, professor, former Member of Parliament (of Lebanese descent)

Political activists
Maher Arar - human rights activist; deportation and tortured victim in Syrian jail (of Syrian descent)
Monia Mazigh - human rights activist and New Democratic Party candidate (of Tunisian descent)
Samah Sabawi - Palestinian rights activist and playwright
Rahaf Mohammed - Refugee and activist from Saudi Arabia

Filmmakers and writers

Rawi Hage (Author: De Niro's Game, Beirut Hellfire Society, Cockroach; Lebanese)
Anisa Mehdi - Emmy Award-winning film director, journalist and director of Inside Mecca (of Iraqi descent)
Wajdi Mouawad (Writer: Incendies, Lebanese)
Donald Shebib - documentary filmmaker (of Lebanese descent)

Singers
Ali Gatie - singer (of Iraqi descent)
Paul Anka - singer (of Syrian descent)
Belly - rap/hip hop artist (of Palestinian descent)
Andy Kim - pop singer/songwriter (of Lebanese descent)
K.Maro - rapper (of Lebanese descent)
Kristina Maria - singer/songwriter (of Lebanese descent)
Massari - pop and hip-hop singer (of Lebanese descent)
Narcy - rapper (of Iraqi descent)
Nasri - reggae and pop singer (of Palestinian descent) 
Vaï - rapper, hip hop singer (of Moroccan descent)
Karl Wolf - singer (of Lebanese descent)
Zaho - singer (of Algerian descent)

Athletes
Ramzi Abid - professional hockey player (of Tunisian descent)
David Azzi - professional player in Canadian Football League (of Lebanese descent)
John Hanna - professional hockey player (of Lebanese descent)
Ed Hatoum - professional hockey player (of Lebanese descent)
Fabian Joseph - former professional hockey player (Canada men's national ice hockey team) (of Lebanese descent)
Nazem Kadri - professional hockey player (of Lebanese descent)
John Makdessi - professional mixed martial arts (MMA) fighter (of Lebanese descent)
Alain Nasreddine - professional hockey player (of Lebanese descent)
Jean Sayegh - water polo player (of Lebanese descent)
Rami Sebei - professional wrestler, under the ring names Sami Zayn and El Generico
 Yassine Bounou - professional soccer player (Morocco national football team) (of Moroccan descent)

Others
Reema Abdo - former backstroke swimmer  (of Yemeni descent)
René Angélil - manager and husband of Céline Dion, (of Syrian descent)
Nahlah Ayed - journalist (of Palestinian descent)
Rachid Badouri - comedian (of Moroccan descent)
Hoda ElMaraghy - first woman to serve as dean of engineering at a Canadian university. Appointed as Canada Research Chair (CRC) in manufacturing systems in 2002.  (of Egyptian descent)
Mohamed Fahmy - journalist and reporter
Ghassan Halazon - entrepreneur (of Jordanian-Palestinian descent)
Jade Hassouné - known for his role as Meliorn in the US television series "Shadowhunters" and for that of Prince Ahmed Al Saeed in the Canadian series '"Heartland" (of Lebanese descent)
Jesse Hutch - actor, model, director and musician (of Syrian descent)
Mena Massoud - an actor best known for starring as Aladdin in the 2019 live-action adaptation (of Egyptian descent)
Keanu Reeves - Hollywood actor (born in Lebanon)
Habeeb Salloum - author, cookbook author, writer, travel writer (of Syrian descent)
Inanna Sarkis - internet personality, actress and director (of Syrian descent)
Mamdouh Shoukri - former president of York University (of Egyptian descent)
Hatim Zaghloul - engineer, named as one of ten great Canadians by MacLean's magazine (of Egyptian descent)
Ty Wood - an actor and model. Grand nephew of Miss Universe 1971 Georgina Rizk (of Palestinian-Lebanese Ukrainian descent.)

See also

Middle Eastern Canadians
West Asian Canadians
Canadian Arab Federation (CAF)
National Council on Canada-Arab Relations (NCCAR)
Arab Christians
Islam in Canada
Lebanese diaspora
Palestinian diaspora
Syrian diaspora
Moroccan diaspora
Iraqi diaspora
Egyptian diaspora

References

External links
Canadian Arab Institute (CAI)
Canadian Arab Federation official website
National Council on Canada-Arab Relations official website
Canada Arab Forum
The Arab Students' Association in Canada

 
Ethnic groups in Canada